CIWW (1310 kHz, CityNews Ottawa) is a commercial AM radio station in Ottawa, Ontario, owned by Rogers Sports & Media, and branded as CityNews Ottawa.  It simulcasts a News/Talk radio format, along with co-owned 101.1 CJET-FM.  The radio studios and offices are at Thurston Drive and Conroy Road in Ottawa.

The station broadcasts at 50,000 watts, the maximum for Canadian AM stations.  The transmitter site is on McKenna Casey Drive, near Strandherd Drive and Ontario Highway 416 in Nepean.  To protect other stations on 1310 AM, it uses a directional antenna.  By day it employs a two-tower array and at night a five-tower array. The nighttime signal is beamed mainly into Canada.

Programming
On weekdays, local all-news blocks are heard in morning and afternoon drive time.  In mid-days, two local talk shows air:  Rob Snow in late mornings and Sam Laprade in early afternoons.  Their shows are repeated in the evening.  Overnights feature the national all-news service shared with CFTR Toronto and CKWX Vancouver.

On weekends, all-news blocks are heard in the mornings and overnights, with talk shows in the afternoons and CBS Sports Radio in the evenings.  ABC News Radio supplies reports on world and U.S. news.  Toronto Blue Jays baseball games are carried.  The Blue Jays, CIWW and CKBY-FM are co-owned by Rogers Communications.

History

CKCO and CKOY
CIWW is Ottawa's oldest station and one of the first in Canada.  Dr. George Geldert launched the station in 1922.  The call sign was CKCO.   The use of the CKCO call letters was not related to CKCO-TV in Kitchener, which signed on decades later.

In its early years, CKCO changed frequencies a number of times, as most early AM radio stations in North America did. With the adoption of the North American Regional Broadcasting Agreement (NARBA), the station moved to its current 1310 AM frequency in 1941. In 1945, CKCO became Ottawa's affiliate of the Canadian Broadcasting Corporation's Dominion Network until the network dissolved in 1962.

In 1949, the station was purchased by Southam, a newspaper and broadcasting company.  The call letters changed to CKOY.

CIWW Oldies
In 1972, sister station CKBY-FM was launched. In 1978, after two failed attempts to sell the stations to Moffat Communications, the Canadian Radio-television and Telecommunications Commission (CRTC) approved their sale to Maclean-Hunter.

The station adopted its current call sign CIWW in 1985, switching to an Oldies format.  The playlist was mostly music of the late 1950s to early 1970s. The name used over the air was W1310, followed by Sunny 1310. In 1992 the station changed to the branding of Oldies 1310.

All-News Radio
In 1994 the stations became part of Rogers Radio when Rogers acquired Maclean-Hunter.

On October 12, 2010, the station announced it would be adopting an all-news format, to be branded 1310 News, taking effect the following Monday, October 18, at 6:00 a.m. CIWW is the fourth Rogers station to adopt a 24-hour all-news format after CFTR Toronto, CKWX Vancouver, and CFFR Calgary.  The company also owns four other stations that combine the all-news format (during morning and afternoon drive) with talk programming.

The final song played on the station in its oldies format, at 5:55 a.m. on October 18, 2010, was "Life Is a Rock (But the Radio Rolled Me)", a song which rapidly recounts radio from the 1950s, '60s & '70s. This was followed at 5:58 a.m. by an announcement that the format change was taking effect.

Adding Sports
Rogers announced on November 5, 2013 that CIWW would begin carrying Sportsnet Radio programing from Toronto sister station CJCL for the bulk of its schedule. The station continues its all-news format during drive time hours.  It also introduced a local late-morning general-interest talk show, Talk to the Hand, hosted by Ed Hand. The move was concurrent with layoffs at Rogers.

On November 24, 2014, 1310 News made a slight change to their schedule, which included morning news beginning a half-hour earlier at 5:00am, Talk to the Hand was renamed to The Ed Hand Show and began airing for three hours, from 10 – 1pm. Afternoon news, hosted by Mark Day (actor) and Lisa Best, now began and ended an hour earlier, starting at 2 pm and ending at 7 pm.  Prime Time Sports ran in the evening.

Adding More Talk
On March 18, 2016, 1310NEWS named Mark Sutcliffe, a longtime Ottawa broadcaster as host of Ottawa Today, airing weekdays from 9a.m. to 1p.m. It is repeated every weekend from 8a.m.

On May 10, 2016, it was announced that former CTV Ottawa news anchor Carol Anne Meehan would be hosting The Carol Anne Meehan Show, which aired from 1 to 3p.m. The show was later replaced by The Rick Gibbons Show in November 27, 2017.

On September 16, 2016, afternoon newscasts started beginning at 3p.m.

FM Simulcast

On December 3, 2020, at 10:00 a.m., CIWW rebranded itself as CityNews, and began simulcasting on sister station CJET-FM (101.1) while continuing to broadcast on 1310.

The simulcast allows listeners to hear the station on FM if they prefer.  The FM signal is strongest to the south and west of Ottawa, while the AM signal continues to cover Ottawa's eastern suburbs that may not pick up the FM station.

Notable broadcasters
 Mark Day (actor), afternoon news anchor, talk show host and actor.
 Rob Snow, host of The Rob Snow Show.
 Mark Sutcliffe, host of Ottawa Today, 59th Mayor of Ottawa

Former broadcasters
 Bryan Fustukian, broadcasting as Vik Armen.
 Rick Gibbons, host of the Rick Gibbons Show.

References

External links
 CityNews Ottawa 1310 AM / 101.1 FM
 
 

Iww
Iww
Iww
Radio stations established in 1922
1922 establishments in Ontario
Iww